Khwahish is a 2003 Indian Hindi romance film directed by Govind Menon. The film stars Himanshu Malik and Mallika Sherawat.

Plot
Amar, rich, stubborn, and serious, meets Lekha in a shop. While Lekha is poor, (the daughter of a poultry farmer), she is a happy, frank, and straightforward girl. When Amar and Lekha study in college, they spend time together and finally fall in love. After the exams, Amar cannot take the separation and proposes to her. Her father Ulhas befriends Amar and accepts the marriage. However, Amar's wealthy politician father does not as he cannot reconcile to the difference in status. Also, he wants his son to complete his studies first before getting married. Amar breaks contact with his father and marries Lekha. The married couple move into their new little home but after days of happiness and good times, medical reports indicate Lekha has leukemia.

Cast
Himanshu Malik as Amar Ranawat
Mallika Sherawat as Lekha Khorzuvekar
 Mahmud Babai as Ulhas Khorzuvekar (Lekha's father)
 Shivaji Satam as Amar's father

Music
Music was composed by Milind Sagar. Lyrics were penned by Faiz Anwar. 
All tracks were sung by Asha Bhosle.

Critical reception
Taran Adarsh of IndiaFM gave the film 1 star out of 5, writing ″On the whole, KHWAHISH leaves many 'khwahishes' unfulfilled. The gentry would find it hard to relate to a love story with minimal emotions, while the front benchers - expecting a lot of skin show - will be grossly disappointed as well. At the box-office, the film will face an uphill task.″ Adhitya Suvarna of Rediff.com gave a negative review, writing ″Khwahish is a waste of time. Forget the script; there is none. What's worse, the chemistry between the lead couple, Mallika Sherawat and Himanshu Malik, is non-existent. The much-hyped 17 kisses come and go before you even realise it.″

References

External links
 

2003 films
2000s Hindi-language films
Indian remakes of American films